The Aldred Building (French: Édifice Aldred; also known as Édifice La Prévoyance) is an Art deco building on the historic Place d'Armes square in the Old Montreal quarter of Montreal, Quebec, Canada.

Completed in 1931,  the building was designed by Ernest Isbell Barott, of the firm Barott and Blackader, with a height of 96 metres (316 ft) or 23 storeys. Built at a cost of $2,851,076.00, Barott endeavored to design a modern building which would, at the same time, fit with the square's historic surroundings. The building's setbacks at the 8th, 13th, and 16th floors allow more light on the square and create a cathedral-like massing, reflecting the adjacent Notre-Dame Basilica. The building uses limestone, common to other buildings in the area. The Aldred Building also attempts to address both Place d'Armes and Notre-Dame Street which do not meet at right angles, aligning with both streets until the third floor, where it then steps back and becomes square to Notre-Dame. The odd angle is small and not immediately noticeable from street-level.

The building resembles New York's Empire State Building, completed the same year, and was built for Aldred and Company Limited, a New York City-based international finance company.

Materials

The exterior utilizes Indiana limestone set on a granite base in combination with aluminum spandrels. The interior doors are inlaid with white metal, with the exterior gates in bronze. Surrounding the doors and covering the walls and floors of the entrance lobby are a variety of marbles, including Belgian Black, Yellow Sienna, Tinos Greek, St. Genevieve Golden Vein, Verde Antique, and Moutonelle. Flooring above the ground level is made of terrazzo with brass strips. Bronze also makes up the frames for windows of the ground floor bank, and is used in trim throughout the building along with stainless steel.

The steel structure of the building is supported two floors below street level on a solid concrete mat which is nine feet thick. The steel is fireproofed with terra-cotta tiles and supports reinforced concrete floors. The steel structure allows for a total of 840 windows, which cover approximately 20 percent of the building's surface area. Numerous services in the Aldred Building identify it as a modern structure, including conditioned ventilation in the basement and first nine floors, with fresh air 'washed' and filtered in an air-cleaner. Aldred Building features a central vacuum system, an electric time-clock system, an incinerator, paper baler and an ozone machine in the kitchen to eliminate odours. All the floors contain built-in ducts for electrical and telephone cables. The six high-speed elevators were the most modern available in the day, and were installed by Otis Fensom.

References

External links
Archiseek Web site
FICHE D'UN BÂTIMENT: Édifice Aldred (in French)

Skyscrapers in Montreal
Old Montreal
Art Deco architecture in Canada
Landmarks in Montreal
Office buildings in Montreal
Office buildings completed in 1931
Art Deco skyscrapers
Skyscraper office buildings in Canada